The McLaren Senna is a limited-production mid-engined sports car manufactured by McLaren Automotive. The car is the third addition in the McLaren Ultimate Series, joining the F1 and the P1; however, it is not a direct successor to either of the cars. The Senna was unveiled online by the company on 10 December 2017, with the official unveiling taking place at the 2018 Geneva Motor Show.

Nomenclature 

Senna won three Formula One World Drivers' Championship titles and thirty-five Formula One Grand Prix race wins with the team; McLaren also won four consecutive Formula One World Constructor's Championship titles with Senna as part of their driver line-up.

McLaren Automotive holds the rights to the Senna family name along with the Instituto Ayrton Senna. The organisation and McLaren have made the Senna name exclusive to the car, thereby prohibiting any other company from using the name.

Specifications and performance

Design

Exterior

McLaren's main focus while designing the Senna was to achieve faster lap times. In order to do so, McLaren developed a lightweight design that incorporated aerodynamic elements.

The Senna is largely based on the McLaren 720S, using a modified version of its carbon fibre monocoque and engine. The Senna is powered by a modified version of the McLaren 720S'  twin-turbocharged V8 engine codenamed the M840TR.

The car has many aerodynamic elements, there being a large adjustable double-element rear wing (that is operated electronically and has various settings in order to provide optimum performance while also acting as an airbrake), double-element diffuser, Formula One-inspired roof scoop, front and side air intakes, rear air louvres, and large front fenders. Inside the panel beside the intakes is a small set of mini-canards. Areas of low pressure are accompanied using high-performance radiators that ensure improved engine cooling. The car uses dihedral doors, like the previous offerings in the Ultimate Series, and also has optional windows applied on the lower area of its doors.

The Senna uses a new generation of Brembo's carbon ceramic brakes, containing a compound that has three and a half times better thermal conductivity than before, making the brakes smaller and lighter. It also features a new set of lightweight center-lock alloy wheels designed for Pirelli P-Zero Trofeo R tyres. Its central design is a new generation of McLaren's carbon fibre monocoque named MonoCage III, which contributes to the car's relatively low dry weight. The car utilises a top mounted (hot-vee) inconel-titanium exhaust system with three outlet pipes in order for a more aggressive exhaust note and engine emissions.

Interior

The interior consists largely of exposed carbon fibre and Alcantara, with seats that can be upholstered in Alcantara or leather, depending on the customer's preference. Behind the two seats is room large enough for two helmets and race suits, reflecting the car's minimalist and track focused design. The car utilises McLaren's hydraulic RaceActive Chassis Control II (RCC II) suspension along with double-wishbone control arms.

Performance statistics
Manufacturer claimed figures:
In February 2018, McLaren released the full performance statistics of the track-oriented Senna model:
 : 2.8 seconds
 : 6.8 seconds
 : 17.5 seconds
 Standing : 9.9 seconds
 Power-to-weight ratio: 659 hp/tonne
 Top speed:  (manufacturer claims)

Independent test (done by Autocar):
  in 3.1 seconds
  in 5.5 seconds
  in 7.1 seconds
  in 19.8 seconds
 Standing 1/4 mile in 10.4 seconds.

Production 
Every car was hand-built at the McLaren Production Centre in Woking, Surrey, England with a production run of just 500 units, all of which are already sold. The McLaren Senna is listed at a price of £750,000 with the final car auctioned at a price of £1,916,793. Deliveries began in the third quarter of 2018.

McLaren Senna GTR

At the 2018 Geneva Motor Show, McLaren unveiled the concept version of the track-only iteration of the Senna dubbed the Senna GTR. The production Senna GTR unveiled two years later has a different bodywork from the concept, with a different wing setup, toned-down aerodynamics, and utilizes a dual-clutch race transmission for faster gear shifts, a revised suspension system and Pirelli racing slicks in order to make it the fastest non-Formula One vehicle McLaren has ever created for faster lap times. The Senna GTR is estimated to produce at least  from its 4.0 L twin-turbocharged V8 engine and is meant to be faster and more agile than its road-going counterpart. The Senna GTR will be limited to only 75 examples.

In reviewing the future regulations for the World Endurance Championship, the Fédération Internationale de l'Automobile (FIA) identified the Senna GTR as one of several models that fit their vision of a replacement for the Le Mans Prototype class. It was also a competitor at the 2019 Goodwood Festival of Speed.

McLaren Senna LM 

The McLaren Senna LM is a limited run of the McLaren Senna with 825PS engine, developed by the McLaren Special Operations department. The bodywork has unique content including the front fender louvres and unique exhaust outlets. The McLaren orange livery is a homage to the McLaren F1 LM, which itself is made from inspiration to celebrate the winning F1 GTR that won the 1995 Le Mans. The Senna LM also features polished ports and cylinder heads, OZ center-lock wheels with a retro design, satin-gold-tipped quad exhausts, louvers on the front fenders, the removal of the clear panel in the doors from the standard Senna, titanium panels and LM branding. Only 35 units were produced, with 5 units to the US market and 7 right-hand drive units. All 5 US Senna LM were delivered to the same person, a VIP client in Florida. That individual still owns 3 of the 5 US Senna LM, with the other two having been resold to other collectors. One of these models was destroyed in a road accident in 2020 by former Formula One driver Adrian Sutil.

McLaren Senna GTR LM
McLaren, specifically its Special Operations department, officially unveiled the McLaren Senna GTR LM, the road-legal iteration of the trackday-only Senna GTR, online on September 17, 2020. It is not to be confused with the standard McLaren Senna LM. Only five units have been made, and each has a unique paint scheme reflecting the five McLaren F1 GTRs at the 1995 24 Hours of Le Mans. All have been sold: two to a customer in the US, two to a customer in Spain, and one to a customer in the United Kingdom. The cars were made to celebrate the 25th anniversary of McLaren's win at LeMans. They feature OZ Racing wheels and have the same bodywork as the Senna GTR. Power is 20 PS more than a base Senna GTR. The redline is also increased from 8250 rpm up to 9000 rpm.

McLaren Sabre 

In December 2020, McLaren unveiled the Sabre, a McLaren model claimed to be exclusively made for the US market, with design inspirations heavily stemming from the McLaren Ultimate Vision Gran Turismo, while borrowing a few key aerodynamic elements from the McLaren Senna. The car was developed by McLaren Special Operations (MSO) and only 16 cars were produced. 

Only 13 Sabres were delivered to the United States, despite original claims of US-exclusivity. One Sabre went to Lebanon, one Sabre went to Qatar, and one Sabre went to Bahrain. As of August 2022, there are only 12 Sabres in the United States after one moved to Singapore from California. 

That is 35 PS and 7mph more than a base Senna. McLaren claims the Sabre to be the fastest two-seat McLaren when it came out as the McLaren F1 and McLaren Speedtail both have three seats.

References

External links

McLaren Automotive page: Senna, Senna GTR
Press kit: Senna
McLaren Senna - Bruno Senna

Senna
Ayrton Senna
Cars introduced in 2018
Sports cars
Flagship vehicles
Coupés
Rear mid-engine, rear-wheel-drive vehicles
2020s cars
Monuments and memorials to Ayrton Senna